Mirandol-Bourgnounac is a commune in the Tarn department in southern France. René Mauriès, (1921–1999), journalist and writer, winner of the Albert Londres Prize (1956) and the Prix Interallié (1974), was born in Mirandol-Bourgnounac.

See also
Communes of the Tarn department

References

Communes of Tarn (department)